Bucculatrix armeniaca is a moth in the family Bucculatricidae. It is found in Armenia and the southern part of European Russia. The species was first described by G. Deschka in 1992.

The wingspan is 7.6-7.8 mm. The forewings are dirty grey with dark grey markings. The hindwings are shining grey.

References

Natural History Museum Lepidoptera generic names catalog

Moths described in 1992
Bucculatricidae
Moths of Europe